Bright-field microscopy (BF) is the simplest of all the optical microscopy illumination techniques. Sample illumination is transmitted (i.e., illuminated from below and observed from above) white light, and contrast in the sample is caused by attenuation of the transmitted light in dense areas of the sample. Bright-field microscopy is the simplest of a range of techniques used for illumination of samples in light microscopes, and its simplicity makes it a popular technique. The typical appearance of a bright-field microscopy image is a dark sample on a bright background, hence the name.

Light path

The light path of a bright-field microscope is extremely simple, no additional components are required beyond the normal light-microscope setup. The light path therefore consists of:
 a transillumination light source, commonly a halogen lamp in the microscope stand;
 a condenser lens, which focuses light from the light source onto the sample;
 an objective lens, which collects light from the sample and magnifies the image;
 oculars and/or a camera to view the sample image.
Bright-field microscopy may use critical or Köhler illumination to illuminate the sample.

Performance
Bright-field microscopy typically has low contrast with most biological samples, as few absorb light to a great extent. Staining is often required to increase contrast, which prevents use on live cells in many situations. Bright-field illumination is useful for samples that have an intrinsic color, for example chloroplasts in plant cells.

Bright-field microscopy is a standard light-microscopy technique, and therefore magnification is limited by the resolving power possible with the wavelength of visible light.

Advantages
 Simplicity of setup with only basic equipment required.
 Living cells can be seen with bright-field microscopes.

Limitations
 Very low contrast of most biological samples;
 The practical limit to magnification with a light microscope is around 1300X. Although higher magnifications are possible, it becomes increasingly difficult to maintain image clarity as the magnification increases;
 Low apparent optical resolution due to the blur of out-of-focus material;
 Samples that are naturally colorless and transparent cannot be seen well, e.g. many types of mammalian cells. These samples often have to be stained before viewing. Samples that do have their own color can be seen without preparation, e.g. the observation of cytoplasmic streaming in Chara cells.

Enhancements
 Reducing or increasing the amount of the light source by the iris diaphragm.
 Use of an oil-immersion objective lens and a special immersion oil placed on a glass cover over the specimen.  Immersion oil has the same refraction as glass and improves the resolution of the observed specimen.
 Use of sample-staining methods for use in microbiology, such as simple stains (methylene blue, safranin, crystal violet) and differential stains (negative stains, flagellar stains, endospore stains).
 Use of a colored (usually blue) or polarizing filter on the light source to highlight features not visible under white light. The use of filters is especially useful with mineral samples.

References

 Advanced Light Microscopy vol. 1 Principles and Basic Properties by Maksymilian Pluta, Elsevier (1988) 
 Advanced Light Microscopy vol. 2 Specialised Methods by Maksymilian Pluta, Elsevier (1989) 
 Introduction to Light Microscopy by S. Bradbury, B. Bracegirdle, BIOS Scientific Publishers (1998) 
 Microbiology: Principles and Explorations by Jacquelyn G. Black, John Wiley & Sons, Inc. (2005)
 Microscopy and Imaging Literature

Notes

Optical microscopy techniques